In general topology and related areas of mathematics, the initial topology (or induced topology or weak topology or limit topology or projective topology) on a set  with respect to a family of functions on  is the coarsest topology on X that makes those functions continuous.

The subspace topology and product topology constructions are both special cases of initial topologies. Indeed, the initial topology construction can be viewed as a generalization of these.

The dual notion is the final topology, which for a given family of functions mapping to a set  is the finest topology on  that makes those functions continuous.

Definition

Given a set  and an indexed family  of topological spaces with functions

is continuous.

Definition in terms of open sets

Sets of the form  are often called . If  contains exactly one element, then all the open sets of the initial topology  are cylinder sets.

Examples

Several topological constructions can be regarded as special cases of the initial topology.  
 The subspace topology is the initial topology on the subspace with respect to the inclusion map.
 The product topology is the initial topology with respect to the family of projection maps.
 The inverse limit of any inverse system of spaces and continuous maps is the set-theoretic inverse limit together with the initial topology determined by the canonical morphisms.
 The weak topology on a locally convex space is the initial topology with respect to the continuous linear forms of its dual space.
 A topological space is completely regular if and only if it has the initial topology with respect to its family of (bounded) real-valued continuous functions.

Properties

Characteristic property

The initial topology on  can be characterized by the following characteristic property:

Note that, despite looking quite similar, this is not a universal property. A categorical description is given below.

Evaluation

By the universal property of the product topology, we know that any family of continuous maps  determines a unique continuous map

The evaluation map  will be a topological embedding if and only if  has the initial topology determined by the maps  and this family of maps separates points in 

Hausdorffness

Transitivity of the initial topology

Several important corollaries of this fact are now given. 

Separating points from closed sets

where  denotes the closure operator.

Theorem. A family of continuous maps  separates points from closed sets if and only if the cylinder sets  for  open in  form a base for the topology on 

It follows that whenever  separates points from closed sets, the space  has the initial topology induced by the maps  The converse fails, since generally the cylinder sets will only form a subbase (and not a base) for the initial topology.

If the space  is a T0 space, then any collection of maps  that separates points from closed sets in  must also separate points. In this case, the evaluation map will be an embedding.

Initial uniform structure

If  is the topology on  induced by the uniform structure  then the topology on  associated with least upper bound uniform structure is equal to the least upper bound topology of  

It is equal to the least upper bound uniform structure of the -indexed family of uniform structures  (for ). 
The initial uniform structure  is also equal to the coarsest uniform structure such that the identity mappings  are uniformly continuous. 

Uniform continuity: If  is the initial uniform structure induced by the mappings  then a function  from some uniform space  into  is uniformly continuous if and only if  is uniformly continuous for each  

Transitivity of the initial uniform structure: If the word "topology" is replaced with "uniform structure" in the statement of "transitivity of the initial topology" given above, then the resulting statement will also be true.

Categorical description

In the language of category theory, the initial topology construction can be described as follows. Let  be the functor from a discrete category  to the category of topological spaces  which maps .

The forgetful functor  induces a functor .

The assignment  placing the initial topology on  extends to a functor

See also

References

Bibliography

External links

 
 

General topology